Jesseca H. Cross (born October 5, 1975 in New Orleans, LA) is a former track and field athlete from the United States who specialized in throwing events.  She attended the University of Wyoming on a basketball scholarship, and then competed for the United States in the hammer throw and shot put at the 2000 Summer Olympics. She did not progress beyond the qualification round in either event.

Cross was inducted into the Wyoming Sports Hall of Fame in 2002. She was the interim head women's volleyball coach at Northwest College in Powell, Wyoming for the 2007 fall semester. Flavia Siqueira was hired as the permanent coach in March 2008.

Achievements

References

External links
 Jesseca Cross profile at USATF
 
 Olympic profile from Sports Illustrated

Living people
1975 births
American female shot putters
American female hammer throwers
Olympic track and field athletes of the United States
Athletes (track and field) at the 2000 Summer Olympics
People from Laramie, Wyoming
21st-century American women